Kembla Heights is a village west of Wollongong, New South Wales in the Parish of Kembla County of Camden. It is situated along Harry Graham Drive and upper Cordeaux Road and is part of a tourist route that runs along the Illawarra escarpment for a distance between Mount Kembla and Mount Keira. The Dendrobium Colliery (Illawara Coal, South32) is located in Kembla Heights.

The entire village of Kembla Heights is a heritage conservation area under the Wollongong City Council Development Control Plan "Kembla Heights is the most intact mining village in the Wollongong Local Government Area with its simple, consistent late Victorian and early Federation period cottages". It is in fact the last remaining coal mining village that is company owned in the Illawarra today. The southern portion of Cordeaux Road, Kembla Heights, is known as Windy Gully, it is partially company owned and in private ownership and also part of the Kembla Heights Heritage Conservation Area. The historic Windy Gully Cemetery is located in this portion of Kembla Heights and is still company owned.

History 
Kembla Heights is within Dharawal country linking Mt Kemba (the men's mountain) to Mt Keira (the women's mountain) and west to the Cordeaux River Valley that formed a travelling route for Aboriginal people connecting the coast areas to the inland Bargo area.

Timber getters were in the area from the 1810s in search of valuable red cedar (Toona ciliata). Europeans began occupying the landscape for agriculture from the 1850s forming a rural collection of farms associated with the settlement known as American Creek.

Mining 
With the discovery of oil baring shale and coal the land around Kembla Heights was purchased to become a mining settlement. The Pioneer Kerosene Works (1860–1878) Australia's first shale mining and kerosene manufacturing plant was owned by John Graham and situated at Kembla Heights. This plant was purchased by the Mt Kembla Coal and Oil Company (1878–1913) who developed a new coal mine to the north of Kerosene site, later renamed Mt Kembla Colliery Ltd (1913–1946) and finally purchased by Australian Iron and Steel, AIS (1946–1970). Nebo Colliery (1946–1993) was developed by AIS on the site of the original Kerosene works at Kembla Heights.

The Mt Kembla Mine Disaster, Kembla Heights 
Mt Kembla Coal and Oil Company's mine in Kembla Heights was the site of the worst industrial accident in Australia's history, the Mt Kembla Mine Disaster. The disaster took place on Thursday 31 July 1902, at precisely three minutes past two o'clock in the afternoon. The disaster was caused by gas seeping undetected from the coal seam in a disused area of the mine that had been mined out. A rock fall pushed the gas out into the tunnels where men were working. When the gas reached the naked flame of colliery workers light, it ignited instantly and caused a series of further gas and coal dust explosions. The initial blast killed some instantly, but the majority died from Carbon monoxide poisoning which penetrated the tunnels from the incomplete combustion of fuel.

Windy Gully cemetery was created on a half acre of company land to receive the bodies of the victims of the Mt Kembla Mine Disaster of 1902. In all, about a third of the victims were buried at Windy Gully, most either Presbyterian or Methodist. It was originally known as the Kembla Heights Cemetery or Presbyterian Cemetery.

References

Further reading 
Richardson, Wendy (1989) "Windy Gully"  Currency Press

Fitzpatrick, Conal (2002) "KEMBLA BOOK OF VOICES",  Kemblawarra Press Australia.

Trenor, Paul (2013) SPIRITS OF WINDY GULLY – the Mt. Kembla Mine disaster, Self published

Zam, Darian 'Coalfaces'(2016), Self published

Murray, Noel J. (2008), "Memories of Times Gone By", Self Published

Stone, Kevin C. (2002), "A Profile History of Mount Kembla", Self Published

McNamara, John Leo (2007), "Life at Cordeaux River" Self Published

Herben, Carol (2002), "Mt Kembla 1902 Mine Disaster Commemoration Cemetery Walks", Mt Kembla : Mt Kembla Mine Disaster Centenary Commemoration Committee

Piggin, Stuart and Lee, Henry (1992), "The Mt Kembla Disaster", Melbourne : Oxford University Press in association with Sydney University Press

External links 
 Kembla Jottings – timeline, history, Mt Kembla Mine Disaster and victims list, community links
 The Day in 1902 – the Mt Kembla Disaster, short YouTube film.
 Stuart Piggin : Faith of Steel and Mount Kembla Mine Disaster research materials, University of Wollongong Archives
 Mount Kembla Colliery Disaster, 31 July, 1902: report of the Royal Commission, University of Wollongong Archives
 Illawarra Heritage Trail
 Mt Kembla Mining Heritage Inc.
 Mt Kembla Stories – short YouTube film on Mt Kembla and Kembla Heights history.
 Black Dust – 5 part series on YouTube by WIN News Illawarra – Mt Kembla Mine Explosion 110th Anniversary

Suburbs of Wollongong
Mining towns in New South Wales
Coal mining disasters in Australia